Alive in Concert is a live album released by New Zealand Christian rock band The Lads in 2003, after being recorded during a sold out concert at The Salvation Army Johnsonville, Wellington, New Zealand in 2002. It is the first live release from the band, their second being a DVD, Alive in Brisbane, which was recorded in Brisbane, Australia in 2005.

Track listing
Tracks on the album include:
 "Beetroot Stain" - 3:43
 "International Mystery Man" - 4:04
 "The Cactus Song" - 3:43
 "Cannibalism" - 4:32
 "Call My Name / I Could Sing of Your Love Forever" - 7:50
 "Creator" - 5:47
 "I'll Leave the Looking" - 3:40
 "Hey Flower" - 6:08
 "My Forever Smoochie Girl" - 4:00
 "Faithful" - 3:47
 "Ode to Joy / I Give it All" - 8:38
 "Town" - 4:17
 "Who is Mikey Trousers" - 3:19

Personnel
The band is made up of the following members:
Mark Millard – Vocals, Saxophone
Bjorn Bennet – Guitar, Backing Vocals
Bennett Knowles – Bass, Backing Vocals
Chris White – Guitar, Synthesizer, Piano, Trumpet, Accordion, Backing Vocals
Steve King – Drums, Backing Vocals

References

The Lads albums
2003 live albums